Clinton DeWitt Burdick (July 26, 1924 – February 17, 2013) was an American flying ace in the 356th Fighter Group during World War II. He was the son of American World War I flying ace Howard Burdick, who was credited with eight aerial victories.

Early life
Burdick was born in 1924 in Brooklyn.

Military career 
He was influenced by his father to enlist in the Aviation Cadet Program of the U.S. Army Air Forces, which he did on October 21, 1942. He did his basic training in Fort Worth, Texas, where he flew BT-13s and proceeded with advanced training, where he trained on the AT-6. On March 12, 1944, Burdick was commissioned a second lieutenant and awarded his pilot wings at Foster Field in Texas. After graduation, he attended aerial gunnery school on Matagorda Island, where he flew the P-40 Warhawk.

World War II

On September 1944, he was assigned to the 361st Fighter Squadron, 356th Fighter Group at RAF Martlesham Heath in England, where he flew missions in the European theater of World War II. 

Flying P-47 Thunderbolts, Burdick flew his first combat mission on November 6, 1944, and in the same month, the 356th FG converted to P-51 Mustangs. While flying the P-51, he scored his first aerial victory on December 5, when he shot down a Focke-Wulf Fw 190 and damaged another Fw 190 northeast of Berlin. On January 14, 1945, 356th FG's P-51s encountered 15 to 20 Fw 190s, southwest of Dümmer Lake. During the aerial battle, Burdick shot down two Fw 190s and damaged another two.

He finally became a flying ace on February 20, when he shot down three (including one shared) Fi 156s over Bayreuth, which were also his last aerial victories of the war. This made Burdick and his father the only father and son to earn the title of flying ace. He flew his last combat mission on February 20.

During World War II, Burdick was credited with the destruction of 5.5 enemy aircraft in aerial combat plus 3 damaged, 1 shared destruction and 1 destroyed on the ground, while flying 53 combat missions during the war. During his time in the 356th FG, he flew P-51D bearing the name "DoDo". He is one of only five flying aces in the 356th FG.

Later life
Burdick and his wife Connie had a son and several grandchildren.

After the end of World War II, Burdick was discharged from the military in 1946. He attended Massachusetts Institute of Technology, where he graduated with a Bachelor's degree in aeronautical engineering in 1950. In 1952, he graduated from MIT with a Masters degree in aeronautical engineering. At the age of 25, his parents divorced and his father moved to California where he remarried. In 1963, he moved to Los Angeles where his father resided and eventually reconciled with him. Burdick worked in the aviation and electronics industry until his complete retirement in 1989.

He died on February 17, 2013, at the age of 88.

Summary of enemy aircraft damaged/destroyed

All information on enemy aircraft damaged and destroyed is from Stars and Bars.

Awards and decorations
His awards include:

  Army Presidential Unit Citation
Congressional Gold Medal (2015)

References

1924 births
2013 deaths
People from Brooklyn
People from Los Angeles
American World War II flying aces
Military personnel from New York (state)
Aviators from New York (state)
United States Army Air Forces pilots of World War II
United States Army Air Forces officers
Recipients of the Distinguished Flying Cross (United States)
Recipients of the Air Medal
Massachusetts Institute of Technology alumni
American aerospace engineers